The 2005 Seve Trophy took place 22–25 September at Wynyard Golf Club, in North East England. The team captain for Great Britain and Ireland was Colin Montgomerie, with the captain for Continental Europe being José María Olazábal. The overall tournament host was Seve Ballesteros as he was unable to compete through injury. The trophy was retained for the second time by Great Britain and Ireland.

Format 
The format remained the same as in 2003 with the teams competing over four days with five fourball matches on both Thursday and Friday, four greensomes matches on Saturday morning, four foursomes matches on Saturday afternoon and ten singles on Sunday. It means a total of 28 points were available with 14½ points required for victory.

Each member of the winner team received €125,000, the losing team €75,000 each, giving a total prize fund of €2,000,000.

Teams 
The teams were made up of the captain, the leading four players from the Official World Golf Ranking as of Monday 5 September 2005, the leading four players (not otherwise qualified) from the European Order of Merit after the Linde German Masters (11 September 2005), and one captain's pick.

Day one
Thursday, 22 September 2005

Fourball

Source:

Day two
Friday, 23 September 2005

Fourball

Source:

Day three
Saturday, 24 September 2005

Morning greensomes

Source:

Afternoon foursomes

Source:

Day four
Sunday, 25 September 2005

Singles

Source:

References

External links
Coverage on the European Tour's official site

Seve Trophy
Golf tournaments in England
Seve Trophy
Seve Trophy
Seve Trophy